Djurgårdens IF was promoted from Superettan and finished second. This was the beginning of a new era.

Player statistics
Appearances for competitive matches only

|}

Topscorers

Allsvenskan

Svenska Cupen

Friendlies

Competitions

Overall

Allsvenskan

League table

Matches

Svenska Cupen

Friendlies

References

Djurgårdens IF Fotboll seasons
Djurgarden